R35 may refer to:

 R35 (South Africa), a road
 , a destroyer of the Royal Navy
 Nissan GT-R, a sports car
 R35: Causes severe burns, a risk phrase
 R35 expressway, in the Czech Republic, now the D35 motorway
 Renard R.35, a Belgian prototype airliner
 Renault R35, a French tank